Prilesje is a small village southeast of Velike Lašče in central Slovenia. The railway line from Ljubljana to Kočevje runs through the settlement. The entire Municipality of Velike Lašče is part of the traditional region of Lower Carniola and is now included in the Central Slovenia Statistical Region.

References

External links

Prilesje on Geopedia

Populated places in the Municipality of Velike Lašče